Mohamad Amer bin Saidin (born 25 July 1992 in Penang, Malaysia) is a Malaysian footballer who plays as a centre-back for Sarawak United in the Malaysia Premier League.

Amer's older brother, Mohd Syukur Saidin, is also a professional footballer.

Career
Amer started his career with Harimau Muda B team in 2010. He was promoted to Harimau Muda A team in 2011. Amer was part of the Malaysia squad for 2014 Asian Games. After several years with Harimau Muda A, Amer joins Malaysia Super League champions, Johor Darul Takzim.

Honours
Harimau Muda A
 International U-21 Football Tournament Thanh Niên Cup: 2012

Johor Darul Ta'zim
 Malaysian Charity Shield: 2015
 Malaysia Super League: 2015
 Malaysia FA Cup: 2016
 AFC Cup: 2015

References

External links
 
 Amer Saidin Statistics

1992 births
Living people
Malaysian footballers
Malaysian people of Malay descent
People from Penang
Johor Darul Ta'zim F.C. players
Sarawak United FC players
Footballers at the 2014 Asian Games
Sportspeople from Penang
Southeast Asian Games gold medalists for Malaysia
Southeast Asian Games medalists in football
Association football defenders
Competitors at the 2011 Southeast Asian Games
Asian Games competitors for Malaysia
AFC Cup winning players